Quacker or Quackers may refer to:

 Quacker (Tom and Jerry), a cartoon duck character from Tom and Jerry
 Quacker, a type of unexplained sound detected by Soviet submarine crews during the Cold War, also known as Bio-duck
 Quackers, a brand of duck-shaped cracker manufactured by Nabisco in the 1980s